Teneteega ( Honeybee) is a 1991 Telugu-language comedy film produced by J. V. Rama Rao and Uddanda Guru Prasad under the Suma Priya Creations banner and directed by M. Nanda Kumar. It stars Rajendra Prasad, Suma Priya, Rekha and Sitara , with music composed by Vidyasagar. The story was based on Malladi Venkata Krishna Murthy's novel of the same name.

Plot
Varun Kumar (Rajendra Prasad) and Aparna (Rekha) are a very happy married couple who completed 7 years of married life. But after that, Varun is attracted towards so many girls, finally, he tries to have an affair with a beautiful girl Tanvi (Suma Priya). The rest of the story is about how Aparna protects her husband.

Cast
Rajendra Prasad as Varun Kumar
Suma Priya as Tanvi
Rekha as Aparna
Sithara as Amurtha
Brahmanandam as Gokul
Chakravarthy as Tryambakam
Kallu Chidambaram
Badi Tataji as Simham
Kutty Padmini as Keertana
Hema
Disco Shanthi as Pavala Kamala
Ratna Sagar
Kuali
Chandrika as receptionist

Soundtrack

Music composed by Vidyasagar. Music released on LEO Audio Company.

References

Indian comedy films
Films scored by Vidyasagar
Films based on Indian novels
1990s Telugu-language films
1991 comedy films
1991 films